The 2019 IIHF Women's Challenge Cup of Asia was an international women's ice hockey tournament run by the International Ice Hockey Federation (IIHF). The tournament took place between 14 April and 19 April 2019 in Abu Dhabi, United Arab Emirates and was the seventh edition held since its formation in 2010 under the IIHF Challenge Cup of Asia series of tournaments. Thailand won the tournament after finishing first in the standings. Chinese Taipei finished in second place and Singapore finished third.

Overview
The 2019 IIHF Women's Challenge Cup of Asia began on 14 April 2019 in Abu Dhabi, United Arab Emirates with games played at the Zayed Sports City Ice Rink. New Zealand's under-18 team (New Zealand U18), Singapore and Thailand returned after competing in last years tournament. The defending champions, Chinese Taipei's under-18 team, were replaced by the Chinese Taipei women's team and Malaysia joined after winning promotion at the 2018 Division I tournament. The tournament ran alongside the 2019 IIHF Women's Challenge Cup of Asia Division I competition with all games being held in Abu Dhabi.

The tournament consisted of a single round-robin with each team competing in four games. Thailand won the tournament after winning three games and recording an overtime loss to finish at the top of the standings. The win was Thailand's first gold medal of the competition having previously won silver in 2017 and bronze in 2018. Chinese Taipei finished second after losing only to Thailand and Singapore finished in third. Thailand's Nuchanat Ponglerkdee led the tournament in scoring with eleven points and was named the most valuable player. Su-Ting Tan of Chinese Taipei was named best forward and Thailand's Sirikarn Jittresin was named best defenceman. Wasunun Angkulpattanasuk of Thailand finished as the tournaments leading goaltender with a save percentage of 93.62 however the IIHF Directorate named Singapore's Qina Foo as the best goaltender.

Standings
The final standings of the tournament.

Fixtures
All times are local. (UAE Standard Time – UTC+4)

Scoring leaders
List shows the top ten skaters sorted by points, then goals, assists, a greater plus-minus, and then lower penalties in minutes.

Leading goaltenders
Only the top goaltenders, based on save percentage, who have played at least 40% of their team's minutes are included in this list.

See also
2019 IIHF Women's Challenge Cup of Asia Division I

References

External links
Tournament page at IIHF.com

IIHF Women's Challenge Cup of Asia
IIHF Women's Challenge Cup of Asia
IIHF Women's Challenge Cup of Asia
IIHF Women's Challenge Cup of Asia
International ice hockey competitions hosted by the United Arab Emirates
April 2019 sports events in Asia